Serényfalva is a village in Borsod-Abaúj-Zemplén County in northeastern Hungary formerly known as Málé , Serényimál and Serényifalva.

Serényfalva was first settled in the 13th century.

References

Populated places in Borsod-Abaúj-Zemplén County